Lilian Charlotte Anne Knowles (née Tomn; 1870–1926) was a British historian and Professor of Economic History at the London School of Economics (LSE) in the 1920s. She was the first female Dean of the Economic History Faculty in the University of London.

Biography 
Born in St Clement, Cornwall, Knowles attended Truro High School. After a tour of the continent with her family she went to Girton College, Cambridge. At Girton she read history and law taking both a History Tripos and a Law Tripos (Part 1) in 1894. Both were judged to be "first class" and she was the first woman to obtain a first class in the law tripos. At the time she took her degree Cambridge did not allow women to receive their degrees. Knowles, as with many other such female students from both Cambridge and Oxford universities, was later, in 1907, to take the steamboat to Ireland to be conferred with an ad eundem University of Dublin degree at Trinity College, Dublin. Hers was a DLitt. Thus she became one of the steamboat ladies.

Between 1895–99 she was one of the London School of Economic's first research students and taught there as an occasional lecturer between 1897 and  1898. In 1904 she gained a teachership in modern economic history at LSE — thus, according to Berg, "becoming the first full-time teacher of the subject at any British university". In 1907 she was promoted to Reader in economic history. In 1921 she was promoted to a professorship in Economic History becoming Britain's second professor in that subject (the first being George Unwin at the University of Manchester). From 1920 to 1924 she served as the University of London's Dean of the Faculty of Economics. This made her the first woman to become a Dean of the University of London.

Outside academia, she was the only female member of the Royal Commission on Income Tax, 1919–1920 and she was especially concerned with the practice, extant at the time, of charging income tax on joint income of married couples. She was also a member of the Council of the Royal Economic Society and of the Council of the Royal Historical Society.
The Cornish community in London led by LSE graduate Tim James are seeking that this Cornish pioneer is commemorated with her own blue plaque.

Legacy
Since 2006, the LSE has had a 360-bedroom development reserved for their postgraduate students. The building is based on a Victorian building and it is now called the "Lilian Knowles House". There are also two student prizes named after her at LSE; one for the highest marks in the first year and one for the highest marks in the final year of the Economic History Undergraduate degree programme.

Selected publications
 Knowles, Lilian Charlotte Anne. (1921). The industrial and commercial revolutions in Great Britain during the nineteenth century. London: Routledge.
 Knowles, Lillian Charlotte Anne. (1924). The economic development of the British overseas empire, London: Routledge.

References

External links 

 
 "Knowles; Lilian Charlotte Anne (1870–1926)" at archives.lse.ac.uk

1870 births
1926 deaths
Academics of the London School of Economics
Alumni of Girton College, Cambridge
British historians
British women historians
People educated at Truro High School
People from Truro
Steamboat ladies